Dance song may refer to:

A danceable song; see dance music
A song concerning itself almost entirely with a particular dance; in most cases most or all of the song lyric is given over to instructions for the associated dance, for example:
"Hokey cokey" (known as "Hokey pokey" in the United States, Canada, Ireland, Australia, the Caribbean and Mexico)

See also
Novelty and fad dances
:Category:Dance music songs
"The Dance-Song" from Thus Spoke Zarathustra
"Dance Song '97", a song by Sleater-Kinney from the album Dig Me Out
Competitive dance music